is a feminine Japanese given name.

Possible writings
Shizuka can be written using different kanji characters and can mean:
, "quiet/calm"
, "quiet/calm, flower"
, "quiet/calm, fragrance"
, "quiet/calm, flower"
, "quiet/calm, excellent"
, "quiet/calm, summer".
The name can also be written in hiragana or katakana.

People with the name
 , Taiwanese actress
 , Japanese voice actress
 , Japanese figure skater
 , also known as Lady Shizuka, one of the most famous women in Japanese history and literature
 , Japanese voice actress
 , Japanese novelist and lyricist
 , Japanese actress and dancer
 , Japanese voice actress
 , Japanese voice actress
 , Japanese voice actress
 , Japanese politician
 , Japanese singer
 , Japanese ball-jointed doll maker and musician
 , Japanese gravure idol and actress
, Japanese table tennis player
 , motorcycle racer
 , Japanese actress, gravure idol, and writer
 Shizuka Sugiyama (born 1987), Japanese mixed martial arts fighter
 , badminton player
 , Japanese photographer

Fictional characters
 Lady Shizuka, a character in the book Autumn Bridge by Takashi Matsuoka
 , a male character in the manga and anime series xxxHolic
 , a character in the manga and anime series Detective Conan
 , a character in the manga and anime series Vampire Knight
 , a character in the manga series JoJo's Bizarre Adventure, by Hirohiko Araki
 , a character in the manga and anime series Yu-Gi-Oh!
 , a character in the series High School of the Dead
 , a character in the manga and anime series Doraemon
Shizuka Muto, a character in the book trilogy Tales of the Otori
 , a character in the Super Sentai series GoGo Sentai Boukenger
 , a character in the Yo-kai Watch franchise
 , a character in the shōnen manga series Boarding School Juliet
 , a character in the shōjo manga series Boys Over Flowers
 Kiryu Shizuka, a character and a Miko from  Yuki Yuna is a Hero: Bouquet of Brilliance who is friends with Akamine Yuna and Yumiko’s ancestor Renge.

See also
 Shizuko, unisex Japanese given name related to Shizuka

Japanese feminine given names